The following is a list of Hawaii Rainbow Warriors basketball head coaches. There have been 22 head coaches of the Rainbow Warriors in their 102-season history.

Hawaii's current head coach is Eran Ganot. He was hired as the Rainbow Warriors' head coach in April 2015, replacing Benjy Taylor, who was not retained after serving as interim coach for the 2014–15 season.

References 

Hawaii

Hawaii Rainbow Warriors basketball, coaches